Events in the year 1087 in Japan.

Incumbents
Monarch: Shirakawa then Horikawa

Events
January 3 - Retired Emperor Shirakawa initiates cloistered rule. (Traditional Japanese Date: Twenty-sixth Day of the Eleventh Month, 1086)

References

 
 
Japan
Years of the 11th century in Japan